Meditation (also released as Dynamic Duo) is an album of duets by the American saxophonist George Coleman and Spanish pianist Tete Montoliu recorded in early 1977 and released on the Dutch label, Timeless.

Reception

Steve Loewy of AllMusic states, "A pairing of tenor saxophonist George Coleman and pianist Tete Montoliu might at first seem odd, but this is a remarkably coherent album in nearly every respect. Coleman and Montoliu are each at the top of their form (coming straight from a European tour), the saxophonist blowing strings of notes like soap bubbles from a pipe and Montoliu singing his Tatum-esque lines".

Track listing
All compositions by George Coleman except as indicated
 "Lisa" (Tete Montoliu) – 5:28
 "Dynamic Duo" – 4:03
 "First Time Down" – 5:01
 "Waltzing at Rosa's Place" – 6:38
 "Meditation" (Antônio Carlos Jobim, Newton Mendonça) – 11:55
 "Sophisticated Lady" (Duke Ellington, Irving Mills, Mitchell Parish) – 5:50

Personnel
George Coleman – tenor saxophone
Tete Montoliu – piano

References

George Coleman albums
Tete Montoliu albums
1977 albums
Timeless Records albums